is a name given to a group of three famous Chinese calligraphers who lived in Japan:

 Ingen Ryūki, 隱元隆琦 1592–1673
 Mokuan Shōtō,木庵性瑫 1611–1684
 Sokuhi Nyoitsu, 即非如一 1616–1671

They are all connected with the Ōbaku school of Zen Buddhism. Analogous groups of famous calligraphers include the Sanseki and Sanpitsu.

Obaku Zen
17th-century Japanese calligraphers
Trios
Artists from Fujian

17th-century Chinese calligraphers